Uladzimir Khvashchynski (born 10 May 1990) is a Belarusian professional footballer who plays for Dinamo Minsk.

International career
Khvashchynski was a member of the Belarus U21 that finished in 3rd place at the 2011 UEFA European Under-21 Football Championship. He appeared as a substitute in two of the matches. He also represented the Belarus Olympic team that participated in the 2012 Toulon Tournament and was also part of the 2012 Summer Olympics squad, though he remained an unused substitute. He made his debut for the senior national team of his country on 14 November 2012, in the 2–1 away win over Israel in a friendly match.

International goals
Scores and results list Belarus' goal tally first.

Honours
Shakhtyor Soligorsk
Belarusian Cup winner: 2018–19

References

External links

1990 births
Living people
People from Babruysk
Sportspeople from Mogilev Region
Belarusian footballers
Association football forwards
Belarusian expatriate footballers
Expatriate footballers in Kazakhstan
Olympic footballers of Belarus
Footballers at the 2012 Summer Olympics
Belarus international footballers
FC Dynamo Brest players
FC Dinamo Minsk players
FC Minsk players
FC Shakhtyor Soligorsk players
FC Caspiy players